White Rock Colony is a census-designated place (CDP) and Hutterite colony in Roberts County, South Dakota, United States, partly within the Lake Traverse Indian Reservation. It was first listed as a CDP prior to the 2020 census. The population of the CDP was 0 at the 2020 census.

It is in the northeast corner of the county (and the state of South Dakota), on high ground to the west of the valley of the Bois de Sioux River. South Dakota Highway 127 runs along the eastern edge of the CDP, leading south and west  to Rosholt and north (as North Dakota Highway 127)  to Fairmount, North Dakota.

Demographics

References 

Census-designated places in Roberts County, South Dakota
Census-designated places in South Dakota
Hutterite communities in the United States